Sonasid is a steel manufacturing company jointly owned by ArcelorMittal and the SNI, the holding company of king Mohammed VI.

Founded as a state-owned company, SONASID was privatised in 1997 when it was taken over by the king's holding ONA group. In 2006 ArcelorMittal increased their participation in the company. Sonasid operates factories in Nador and Jorf Lasfar.

Key people
Said El Hadi, chairman of the board
Ismail Akalay, Chief Executive Officer
Houda Lazreq, Chief Purchasing Officer
Youssef Hbabi, Chief Financial Officer
Maha Hmeid, Chief Commercial & Marketing Officer
Khalid Naboub, Chief Operations Officer

Source:

Ownership
64.86% Nouvelles Sidérurgies Industrielles (50-50 joint venture between ArcelorMittal and SNI) 	
19.62% various, publicly traded
10.02% RCAR
3.52% CMR
0.82% Wafa Assurance
0.67% MCMA
0.27% ATTIJARIWAFA BANK
0.23%	MAMDA

Source:

References

External links
company profile at Reuters

Société Nationale d'Investissement
Casablanca Stock Exchange
ArcelorMittal
Mining companies of Morocco
Steel companies of Morocco